Louis Wolff (1898 in Boston, Massachusetts – 28 January 1972) was an American cardiologist.  He described the eponymously named Wolff-Parkinson-White syndrome with Doctors John Parkinson (1885–1976) and Paul Dudley White (1886–1973).

Personal life
Louis Wolff married Alice Muscanto, a flute player born in Vilnius who played with her sisters and brothers in a touring musical ensemble. Louis was a concert-quality violinist who enjoyed accompanying his wife and her siblings in their apartment in Brookline, Massachusetts. Louis and Alice had two children, Lea (b. July 1, 1921; d. December 1, 2007), a French teacher for many years in Boston public schools, and Richard (born August 20, 1923; d. February 14, 2009), also a cardiologist. Louis remarried after Alice's death, to Phyllis Raftell-Wolff, and together they had two more children, Sarah (b. 1954), an elementary school teacher, and Charles (b. 1959), a physician.

Education and career
Dr. Wolff graduated from Massachusetts Institute of Technology and the Harvard Medical School; and he was a past president of the New England Cardiovascular Society. He was a clinical professor of medicine at Harvard Medical School.

Death
Louis Wolff died on January 28, 1972.

Associated eponyms
 Wolff-Parkinson-White syndrome

References

External links
Who named it? - Louis Wolff
Louis Wolff Obit NY Times.
Bundle-Branch Block with Short P-R Interval in Healthy Young People Prone to Paroxysmal tachycardia - originally published in The American Heart Journal vol.5, issue 6, August 1930 pages 685–705.
PubMed link to the above article. 

1898 births
1972 deaths
American cardiologists
People from Boston
People from Brookline, Massachusetts
Massachusetts Institute of Technology alumni
Harvard Medical School alumni